The BC Summer Games are an amateur sporting event held every year biennially in the province of British Columbia, Canada. The next games are scheduled to be held in Prince George in July 2022.

See also
BC Games
BC Winter Games
Canada Games
Canada Summer Games
Canada Winter Games
Western Canada Summer Games
Alberta Winter Games
Saskatchewan Games
Manitoba Games
Ontario Games
Quebec Games

External links
 Official Site

Summer
Multi-sport events